Richard Robert Ruccolo (born March 2, 1972) is an American television and film actor, best known for his lead role in the sitcom Two Guys and a Girl (originally titled Two Guys, a Girl and a Pizza Place).

Early life
Ruccolo was born in Marlton, New Jersey. He attended Cherokee High School in Evesham Township, New Jersey. It was there Ruccolo first discovered his love of acting while starring as the lead in the high school's production of Oklahoma! After graduating he moved to Los Angeles to find work as an actor. Throughout his auditions, Ruccolo slept on his friend's sofa until he found work.

Career
Gradually Ruccolo began to find guest roles in such dramas as  Beverly Hills, 90210 and The X-Files. He starred in nationally televised commercials for Wendy's, Skittles and 7 Up. However, it was not until 1998 that Ruccolo became recognized. Ruccolo found fame as Pete Dunville in the sitcom Two Guys and a Girl. When the series was canceled in 2001, Ruccolo starred in All Over the Guy, The One, Missing in the USA, and Anacardium. In 2005, he guest starred in three episodes of Joey as Glen.

In 2008 and 2010, Ruccolo starred in the Lifetime sitcom Rita Rocks.

Personal life
Ruccolo was once engaged to former Saved by the Bell star Tiffani Thiessen. They met in 2000 when Thiessen guest starred in several episodes of Two Guys and a Girl. Their relationship ended in March 2003. In 2008, he married Lauren Rees.

Filmography

Film

Television

References

External links 
 

1972 births
Living people
Male actors from New Jersey
American male film actors
American male television actors
Cherokee High School (New Jersey) alumni
People from Evesham Township, New Jersey
20th-century American male actors
21st-century American male actors